Hansüli Minder (born 16 March 1958) is a Swiss sports shooter. He competed at the 1984 Summer Olympics and the 1992 Summer Olympics.

References

1958 births
Living people
Swiss male sport shooters
Olympic shooters of Switzerland
Shooters at the 1984 Summer Olympics
Shooters at the 1992 Summer Olympics
Place of birth missing (living people)